Tha Truth is the seventh studio album by American rapper Trae tha Truth. It was released on July 24, 2015, by ABN Entertainment, alongside T.I.'s Grand Hustle Records and Empire Distribution. Tha Truth serves as his first release under the Grand Hustle Records. The production on the album was provided by J. Cole, Jae the Giant, and League of Starz; as well as the album features guest appearances from his label-mate T.I., along with several other artists such as Nipsey Hussle, Jeremih, and Ty Dolla Sign, among others.

Background
In March 2012, Trae tha Truth signed a recording contract to Atlanta-based rapper T.I.'s Grand Hustle Records imprint. In March 2013, Trae revealed that the title to the album would be called Banned. On March 17, 2015, Trae tha Truth revealed that his seventh album would be a double album, called Tha Truth. He also unveiled the album's cover art, while revealing that this album would be released on June 22, 2015. However, the album was delayed, along with the changes on the album cover.

Singles
"I Don't Give a Fuck" was released as the album's first single via digital distribution on June 9, 2015. The song features guest verse from a fellow American rapper Rick Ross, with the production by Jae the Giant.

The album's second single, "Tricken Every Car I Get" was released on July 3, 2015. The song features guest verses from these American rappers Future and Boosie Badazz, with the production by League of Starz. On July 24, the music video for "Tricken Every Car I Get", featuring Future and Boosie Badazz, directed by Philly Fly Boy, premiered on WorldStarHipHop.

Track listing

Charts

References

2015 albums
Trae tha Truth albums
Columbia Records albums
Grand Hustle Records albums
Empire Distribution albums
Albums produced by J. Cole
Albums produced by Vinylz